The 2020 Tipperary Senior Football Championship (sponsored by FBD Insurance) is the 130th edition of the Tipperary GAA's premier club Gaelic football tournament for senior graded teams in County Tipperary, Ireland. The tournament consists of 16 clubs with the winner going on to represent Tipperary in the Munster Senior Club Football Championship. 

Clonmel Commercials were the defending champions and retained the title after a 1-16 to 1-15 win against Loughmore–Castleiney in the final on 27 September.

Regional Champions
West Tipperary S.F.C. Final

Mid Tipperary S.F.C. Final

South Tipperary S.F.C. Final

Team Changes
The following teams have changed division since the 2019 Tipperary Senior Football Championship.

To S.F.C.
Promoted from 2019 Tipperary I.F.C.
 Moycarkey–Borris -  (Intermediate Champions)

From S.F.C.
Relegated to 2020 Tipperary I.F.C.
 Kiladangan

Group stage
All 16 teams enter the competition at this stage. The winners of the group stage progress to the semi-finals. The bottom teams of each group enter the relegation play-off.

Group A

Results

Group B

Group C

Results

Group D

Results

Relegation play-off

Semi-finals

Final

Finals

Bracket

Semi-finals

Final

References

External links
Tipperary GAA Official Site

Tipperary Senior Football Championship
Tipperary Senior Football Championship
Tipperary SFC